John Wilkinson Birch (1878 – 10 October 1953) was an English professional rugby league footballer who played in the 1890s and 1900s. He played at representative level for Great Britain, England and Yorkshire, and at club level for Leeds Parish Church and Leeds (Heritage No. 130), as a forward (prior to the specialist positions of), during the era of contested scrums.

J.W.Birch was born on 1 June 1878 and baptised on Christmas Day 1878 at St Mary's church Garforth, Leeds. His father was George Birch of Barrowby Lane who was a very large man weighing around 24 stone and also a very well known character of Garforth known to the villagers as Scribbin Birch, His mother was Alice Ellen Smith of Garforth he married Annie Simpson of Kippax in 1898.

Playing career
Birch played for the Leeds Parish church rugby team he was in the team when they played their last ever match on Wednesday 24 April 1901 Scoring a Try against York with the result going in favour of the Parish Church 21–2 the club was disbanded when the lease on its Clarence Road ground expired When Leeds Parish Church disbanded in 1901 the Church Committee generously placed the whole of their playing staff at the disposal of the Leeds Club who welcomed John Wilkinson Birch and seven of his colleagues; W. Cororan, C. Crumpton, W. Evans, S. Herberts, G. Hewlett, J. McNicholas, and George Mosley. These players did more than merely join the Leeds club, they gave to it all their loyalty, skill and spirit. John Wilkinson Birch made his début against Wakefield Trinity at Headingley on 7 September 1901 running out winners 16–9, many Leeds followers think that strength of the side of these days was greater than anything there has been at Headingley since, and there are many good judges who firmly believe that this 1906 team was the best that ever wore the Leeds jersey; Young, Jenkins, T. Llewellyn, Thomas, Hughes, Ward, Brayshaw, Hewlett, Stead, Lunn, Watts, Webster, Wainwright, Wormald, John Wilkinson Birch. It may be that the passage of time lends enchantment, but it is certainly no exaggeration to say that many of the players in that team are still revered at Headingley today.

International honours
John Wilkinson Birch won a cap for England while at Leeds in 1908 against Wales, and won a cap for Great Britain while at Leeds in 1908 against New Zealand.

Leeds v The Rest 1902 
When Leeds won the Yorkshire Senior Competition in 1901/02 Leeds proved themselves true Champions with victory over The Rest a team made up of the best players from rival clubs the result been 7–5 on 19 April 1902 at Headingley. The team that day was; Dean, Evans, Littlewood, Davies, Mudd, George Mosley (another ex-Leeds Parish Church), Grace, Hewlett, John Wilkinson Birch, Crumpton, McNicholas, Taylor, Crowther, Hanson, Midgley.

Leeds v New Zealand 1907 
The Leeds team took on New Zealand on 26 October 1907 at Headingley during their pioneering 1907–08 tour of Great Britain. The game was kicked off by Birch in heavy rain making the ground treacherous underfoot the game ended up a win for the tourists 8–2, the team that day was; Young, Scamans, Fawcett, Thomas, Llewellyn, Ward, Wilson, John Wilkinson Birch, Burnley, Harrison, Stead, Wainwright, Webster.

Northern union/Great Britain v New Zealand 1908 
Birch once again met the New Zealand in the third test match on Saturday 13 February 1908 at the Athletic Ground, Cheltenham when he won a cap for Great Britain while playing for his club team Leeds, the game was won by New Zealand 8–5 and the famous encounter would become known as the Great Match of the Edwardian Period. The Great Britain team that day was; H. Taylor, W. Batten, B. Jenkins, P. Thomas, G. Tyson, T. White, J. Jolley, A. Smith, J. L. Clampitt, John Wilkinson Birch, J. Spencer, W. Holder.

Retirement 
Birch retired in 1909. His final game was against Hunslet in the 2nd round of the Northern Union Cup. He broke his collarbone within the first 10 minutes of the cup tie but with rare pluck kept on playing as the Yorkshire Evening Post states (20 March 1909). The match was played in front of 22,000 thousand spectators and Hunslet opted to play there biggest six forwards leaving out Smales and Davies and the result justified this selection, The Leeds front rank being entirely worn down by the "Terrible Six" before the end of the game. The result been Hunslet 15 Leeds 9. The Leeds team that day was; F. Young, G. Desborough, F. Oliver, F. Ware, W. Goldthorpe, J. Fawcett, R. Ward, R. Jones, F. Webster, F. Harrison, S. Whitaker, J. Townend, T.H. Wainwright, W. Jarman, J.W. Birch, and E. Hughes.

Death
He died on 10 October 1953 (aged 75) at St James's Hospital, Leeds. He was buried on 14 October 1953 at All Saints Church Barwick in Elmet.

References 

1878 births
1953 deaths
England national rugby league team players
English rugby league players
Great Britain national rugby league team players
Leeds Rhinos players
People from Garforth
Rugby league forwards
Rugby league players from Leeds
Yorkshire rugby league team players